EDSA stands for "Epifanio de los Santos Avenue", a highway around Metro Manila, Philippines.

EDSA may also refer to:

EDSA in the Philippines
 People Power Revolution, known as EDSA I, of 1986
 Second EDSA Revolution of January 2001
 EDSA III, or May 1 riots, May 2001
 EDSA Busway, a bus transit system
 EDSA Shrine, erected to commemorate the 1986 revolution; site of the 2001 revolutions
 EDSA station (PNR) of the Philippine National Railways
 EDSA station (LRT) of the Metro Manila LRT

Other uses
 EDSA (company), an architecture and urban planning firm formerly known as Edward D. Stone, Jr., and Associates

See also
 
 EDSA Revolution (disambiguation)